Maria Sanchez and Fanny Stollár were the defending champions from when the tournament was last held in 2019, but they lost in the semifinals to Ellen Perez and Astra Sharma.

Perez and Sharma went on to win the title, defeating Desirae Krawczyk and Giuliana Olmos in the final, 6–4, 6–4.

Seeds

Draw

References

External links
Main Draw

2021 Abierto Zapopan - 2
Abierto Zapopan - 2
Mex